Sidney Parker, also known as S. E. Parker, (9 November 1929 – December 2012) was a British egoist and a former individualist anarchist who wrote articles and edited several journals from 1963–1993. Notably Parker wrote the introductions to the books Might is Right (Loompanics Unlimited, 1984) and The Ego and Its Own (Rebel Press, 1982) by Max Stirner.

Life and work
Parker was born in Birmingham. He quit school at the age of fourteen and never entered formal studies. In the early 1950s he used to "soap-box" at Speaker's Corner in London's Hyde Park, normally just opening the Sunday afternoon meetings of the then London Anarchist Group.
He summarized his career as follows: "[He] has worked his way through the Young Communist League (1944-1946), the British Federation of Young Co-operators (1946-1947), and virtually all the different varieties of anarchism (1947-1982), to emerge as his own man, the penny of conscious egoism having finally dropped."

In 1993 Parker looked back on his career by comparing his first editorial (1963) with a last statement (1993) on his position. In 1963, having arrived at individual anarchism, he had written: "If anarchism is not individualist, then it becomes hodge-podge, half-way house between socialist and democratic myths and the impulse to individual sovereignty." The name of his journal, Minus One, was derived from his statement: "Individualist anarchists are people who do not want to be just 'a plus one in the statistical millions.'" Slowly he emancipated himself from "the closed world of anarchists". The "emotional capital" he had invested in anarchism was such "that I did not finally renounce my adherence to it until almost twenty years later [around 1983]." The anarchism he had finally abandoned was "a creed of social transformation aiming at the ending of all domination and exploitation of man by man", with the "central tenet": "Dominating People Is Wrong". After Parker had changed from individualist anarchist to conscious egoist, and as such, he "can see no reason why I should not dominate others [...] Egoism leaves any way open to me for which I am empowered." Parker closed these final statements with a quotation, not by Max Stirner, but by Ragnar Redbeard.

Parker worked from 1961 to 1994 for British Rail. He died in London.

Editor and Author
Parker founded and edited a journal that appeared subsequently under three resp. four different titles: 
 Minus One
 from September 1963 (No. 1) to [autumn] 1980 (No. 44), average 10 pp, irregular intervals
 EGO (incorporating Minus One); subtitle: An Individualist Review
 from 1982 (No. 1) to 1993 (No. 15), (Nos. 4 to 12 titled The Egoist), average 10 pp
 No. 16/17 (1994) was a commemorative issue, celebrating the 150th anniversary of Max Stirner's Der Einzige und sein Eigentum. Parker noted on p. 20: "From the next issue Ego will be incorporated into Non-Serviam which is edited and published by Svein Olav Nyberg. However, I intend to issue occasional 'viewsletters', usually consisting of one or two A4 sized pages." Two of these issues appeared under the title En Marge: No.1 (August 1995), No.2 (September 1996).

Contributions to these journals were made by Parker himself and the following authors:
Max Stirner, Dora Marsden, Benjamin De Casseres, James J. Martin, Murray Rothbard, Donald Rooum, Laurance Labadie, Lyman Tower Sargent, Émile Armand, James L. Walker, Renzo Novatore, Francis Ellingham, Enzo Martucci a.o.

Reception
One early reaction to Parker's ideas was that of Lyman Tower Sargent, who later became one of the world's foremost scholars on utopian studies. He contributed to Parker's journal Minus One. In the first edition of his book Contemporary political Ideologies (1969) he presented Parker as "one of the very few living theorists" of Individualist Anarchism. In later revised editions Parker is no longer mentioned.

External links

 Sidney E. Parker Archives
 Sidney Parker Bibliography
 Sidney Parker: My Anarchism. In: Free Life. The Journal of the Libertarian Alliance, Vol. 2, N° 2, Spring 1981 (Parker explains his conversion from communist anarchism to Egoist individualist anarchism)
 [http://www.unionofegoists.com/s-e-parker/ Section on Parker in Union of Egoists]
 Sidney Parker: The Egoism of Max Stirner
 TOCs of SEP's journal MINUS ONE 1963–1980
 TOCs of SEP's journal EGO 1982–1993
 Sidney Parker: Archists, Anarchists, and Egoists (Review of John Carroll's Selections of Stirner's The Ego...'')
 David Botsford:  (1991)

Notes

1929 births
2012 deaths
Anarchist writers
British anti-capitalists
British male non-fiction writers
Egoist anarchists
Individualist anarchists
People from Birmingham, West Midlands
English anarchists